Patricia Ann Carone (born March 21, 1943) is a former Democratic member of the Pennsylvania House of Representatives.

References

Democratic Party members of the Pennsylvania House of Representatives
Women state legislators in Pennsylvania
Living people
1943 births
People from Greenville, Pennsylvania
21st-century American women